The Church Street School for Music and Art, located in Tribeca, New York, is the area's only non-profit school for the arts. The institution has served the downtown and outer community since 1990.

External links
 Church Street School's Website

Art schools in New York City
Universities and colleges in Manhattan